Nina Shebalina (born 10 June 1946) is a Soviet cross-country skier. She competed in the women's 10 kilometres at the 1972 Winter Olympics.

Cross-country skiing results

Olympic Games

References

External links
 

1946 births
Living people
Soviet female cross-country skiers
Olympic cross-country skiers of the Soviet Union
Cross-country skiers at the 1972 Winter Olympics
Sportspeople from Novgorod Oblast